Pablo Mauricio Aránguiz Salazar (born March 17, 1997) is a Chilean footballer who plays as a midfielder for Ñublense.

Club career
Aránguiz was born in Independencia, Santiago. He and his younger brother lived with their grandparents in Recoleta after their parents separated. Aránguiz began his football career with Independencia-based club Unión Española. He made his first-team debut on 2 August 2015, as a late substitute in a Copa Chile match against Unión San Felipe, and made his first appearance in the Primera División on 15 October in a 4–0 win at home to Unión La Calera. Under the management of Martín Palermo, Aránguiz became a regular in the match day squad in the 2016–17 Clausura, and a regular in the starting eleven in the 2017 Torneo de Transición, to the extent that he was named under-20 Player of the Season at the ANFP awards ceremony.

On 24 July 2018, Aránguiz signed with Major League Soccer side FC Dallas.

On 30 December 2019, Aránguiz was put on loan from FC Dallas to Universidad de Chile for one year with an option to buy. Universidad made the transfer permanent on 25 November 2020.

International career
Aránguiz represented Chile U23 at the 2019 Toulon Tournament and at the 2020 Pre-Olympic Tournament, making four appearances in both tournaments.

At senior level, he received his first call-up for the 2021 Copa América, making his international debut in the second match against Bolivia at the minute 84.

Honours
Unión Española
 Chilean Primera División runner-up: 2017 Torneo de Transición
FC Dallas
 Mobile Mini Sun Cup (1): 2019
Individual
 ANFP Revelación Sub 20: 2017

References

External links
 
 

1997 births
Living people
People from Santiago
People from Santiago Province, Chile
People from Santiago Metropolitan Region
Footballers from Santiago
Chilean footballers
Chile international footballers
Chilean expatriate footballers
Association football midfielders
Unión Española footballers
FC Dallas players
Universidad de Chile footballers
Chilean Primera División players
Major League Soccer players
Designated Players (MLS)
Expatriate soccer players in the United States
Chilean expatriate sportspeople in the United States
Chilean expatriates in the United States
2021 Copa América players